Phillip Daniel Burleigh (born 22 October 1986) is a Scottish international rugby union player who plays for Kyuden Voltex in Japan . He previously played for Canterbury (2018), Edinburgh Rugby (2014-2018).

Early life
Burleigh was born in Christchurch, New Zealand. He was educated at Shirley Boys' High School.

Professional career

Burleigh represented the Highlanders in the Super Rugby competition and Bay of Plenty in the ITM Cup.

Burleigh was initially selected in the Chiefs 2012 Wider Training Group before being drafted into the Highlanders for the injured Kendrick Lynn. His first match was a week later versus the Chiefs, where he scored the match-winning try at Waikato Stadium. He missed several months while recovering from shoulder surgery, but had returned to form by 2014.

Burleigh moved to Scotland in the summer of 2014, joining Edinburgh. In February 2016 he signed a two-year contract extension.

In August 2018, Burleigh was signed to Canterbury, playing in New Zealand's provincial Mitre 10 Cup for the 2018 season.

In 2018 he signed for Sunwolves, to play in the Super Rugby competition.

International career
After being domiciled in Scotland for three years, Burleigh was invited by coach Gregor Townsend to train with the Scotland squad in October 2017 ahead of the Autumn Internationals. He made his Test debut at Murrayfield against Australia, coming on as a replacement in the 53-24 victory.

References

External links
 playing statistics at itsrugby.co.uk
 profile at www.kyudenvoltex.com
 archive of Bay of Plenty profile

1986 births
Living people
New Zealand rugby union players
Chiefs (rugby union) players
Highlanders (rugby union) players
Bay of Plenty rugby union players
Rugby union centres
Rugby union players from Christchurch
New Zealand expatriate rugby union players
New Zealand expatriate sportspeople in Scotland
Expatriate rugby union players in Scotland
Edinburgh Rugby players
People educated at Shirley Boys' High School
Scotland international rugby union players
Sunwolves players
Rugby union fly-halves
Canterbury rugby union players
Kyuden Voltex players